General Ripley may refer to:
Brig. Gen. Eleazer Wheelock Ripley, United States Army, active during the War of 1812
Brig. Gen. James Wolfe Ripley, United States Army, active during the American Civil War
Brig. Gen. Roswell S. Ripley, Confederate States Army
Brevet Brig. Gen. Edward H. Ripley, United States Army, active during the American Civil War

See also
Ripley (disambiguation)
Ripley (name)